Ordinary court or judicial court is a type of court with comprehensive subject-matter jurisdiction compared to 'specialized court' with limited jurisdiction over specific filed of matters, such as intellectual property court. Due to its comprehensive feature, ordinary courts usually deal with civil case and criminal case, and treated as core part of conventional judiciary. Especially for common law countries, the term superior court is used for courts with general jurisdiction (regardless of instance level in chain of appellate procedure), compared to courts with limited jurisdiction over minor, petty cases such as small claims court.

Sometimes, the term ordinary court is referred to courts with regular procedure or composition, compared to an extraordinary court with irregular procedure or composition.

Ordinary courts by country

France 

In France, ordinary courts are courts under TITLE VIII of Constitution of France separated from administrative courts and constitutional court. These ordinary courts mainly deals with civil and criminal cases, and are composed of judges called 'magistrates' educated from French National School for the Judiciary, while judges composing administrative court and constitutional court are usually not trained in French National School for the Judiciary. Chain of ordinary court's hierarchy inside French judiciary has Court of Cassation as their highest court.

Germany 

In Germany, ordinary courts are explained as courts with 'ordinary jurisdiction', compared to special jurisdictions such as administrative, labour, social security, and fiscal law. Though each of these five jurisdictions including ordinary jurisdiction has its own highest court (usually translated as 'Federal Courts'), all of jurisdictions share same route of legal education and training for Judges. The Federal Court of Justice is highest court of chain of ordinary court's hierarchy. Under ordinary jurisdiction, Federal Patent Court is established as lower court of Federal Court of Justice concerning intellectual property matters.

It is notable that court rulings from each of Federal Courts cannot be appealed, yet can be reviewed as constitutional complaint in Federal Constitutional Court, which is outside of chain of ordinary court's hierarchy, concerning specific issues on constitutionality of such ruling.

South Korea 

In South Korea, ordinary courts are founded by Chapter V, Article 101 of Constitution of South Korea and 'Court Organization Act', separated from Military courts ( by Chapter V, Article 110) and Constitutional Court ( by Chapter VI, Article 111). These ordinary courts are usually referred to merely as 'Court', and have Supreme Court of Korea as their highest court. Inside chain of ordinary court's hierarchy, there are lower courts with specialized jurisdictions, such as family court, administrative court, patent court and bankruptcy court according to Article 3(1) of the Act. Unlike Germany, whether rulings from ordinary courts can be reviewed as constitutional complaint remains as controversy in South Korea.

See also 
 Court
 Specialized court
 General jurisdiction
 Extraordinary court
 Superior court

References

External links 
 List of National Ordinary Courts in Europe, European e-Justice Portal

Courts by type